Blackrock also known as Black Rock is an unincorporated community in Yakima County, Washington, United States, located approximately twelve miles north of Sunnyside.

The community was founded on Blackrock creek, east of Moxee and was named after a large, black rock nearby. A postoffice and store were established in 1906, by Abraham Vanderlinde, who also served as postmaster.

References

Unincorporated communities in Yakima County, Washington
Unincorporated communities in Washington (state)